United Nations Security Council Resolution 1934, adopted unanimously on June 30, 2010, after considering a report by the Secretary-General Ban Ki-moon regarding the United Nations Disengagement Observer Force (UNDOF), the Council extended its mandate for a further six months until December 31, 2010.

The Security Council called for the implementation of Resolution 338 (1973) which demanded negotiations take place between the parties for a peaceful settlement of the situation in the Middle East. It welcomed UNDOF's efforts to implement the Secretary-General's zero-tolerance policy on sexual exploitation and abuse. At the time of the adoption of Resolution 1934, UNDOF was headed by Filipino General Natalio Ecarma III.

Finally, the Secretary-General was requested to report before the end of UNDOF's mandate on measures to implement Resolution 338 and developments in the situation. UNDOF was established in 1974 by Resolution 350 to monitor the ceasefire between Israel and Syria. The report of the Secretary-General pursuant to the previous resolution on UNDOF indicated that the situation in the Middle East remained tense until a settlement could be reached.

See also
 Arab–Israeli conflict
 Golan Heights
 Israel–Syria relations
 List of United Nations Security Council Resolutions 1901 to 2000 (2009–2011)

References

External links
 
Text of the Resolution at undocs.org

 1934
 1934
 1934
2010 in Israel
2010 in Syria
June 2010 events